The Redistribution of Seats (Ireland) Act 1918 (c. 65) was an Act passed by the Parliament of the United Kingdom which redistributed the parliamentary constituencies in Ireland for the House of Commons. It was enacted on the same day as the Representation of the People Act 1918 which extended the franchise throughout the United Kingdom.

This Act replaced the distribution of seats which had been enacted by the Redistribution of Seats Act 1885 and had been in use since the general election of that year. The number of seats was increased from 103 to 105 (and the number of constituencies increased from 101 to 103), with the enfranchisement of two additional universities. The revision was based on a report of a Boundary Commission carried out in 1917 taking population changes in the 1911 census into account.

The new constituencies came into effect at the 1918 general election. Sinn Féin had adopted an abstentionist policy since its foundation, and none of its MPs elected in by-elections prior to this election had taken their seats. In its election manifesto, it called for the establishment of an assembly "comprising persons chosen by Irish constituencies as the supreme national authority to speak and act in the name of the Irish people", which would become the revolutionary Dáil Éireann. The First Dáil met in January 1919 and made a Declaration of Independence of the Irish Republic.

The constituencies in the 1918 Act were superseded by those in the Government of Ireland Act 1920, which created two home rule parliaments in Ireland and reduced the Irish seats at Westminster from 105 to 46. The seats designated in the 1920 Act for the Southern Ireland House of Commons and the Northern Ireland House of Commons were used as the 1921 election to the Second Dáil. The seats designated for Westminster in the 1920 Act would only apply in the six counties of Northern Ireland which remained part of the UK, taking effect at the 1922 general election. The remaining twenty-six Irish counties became the Irish Free State on 6 December 1922, ceasing to be part of the United Kingdom.

Redistributed seats

See also
 Wikipedia:WikiProject UK Parliament constituencies/Historic constituency names
 List of former United Kingdom Parliament constituencies
 List of United Kingdom Parliament constituencies in Ireland and Northern Ireland
 Historic Dáil constituencies

References

 Text of the Redistribution of Seats (Ireland) Act 1918
 

Historic Westminster constituencies in Ireland
 
Lists of constituencies of the Parliament of the United Kingdom
United Kingdom Acts of Parliament 1918
1918 in Ireland
Acts of the Parliament of the United Kingdom concerning Ireland
Politics of Ireland (1801–1923)